The Siena Saints men's basketball team (formerly the Siena Indians) represents Siena College in Loudonville, New York, United States. The NCAA Division I program competes in the Metro Atlantic Athletic Conference and the annual Franciscan Cup.

The Saints are currently coached by Carmen Maciariello. He was named the program's 18th head coach in school history on March 25, 2019.

Siena plays its home games at the 14,500 all-seater MVP Arena in downtown Albany. Prior to joining a conference, Siena had success in the 1950’s, winning the National Catholic Invitational Tournament in 1950 and finishing the 1950-51 College Basketball Season ranked 18th in the AP Poll. Since 1988, the team has appeared in six NCAA Tournaments (1989, 1999, 2002, 2008, 2009 and 2010) and five NIT Tournaments (1988, 1991, 1994, 2000, and 2003). Siena has advanced to the Round of 32 three times in program history. In 1989 they defeated 3rd seeded Stanford 80–78. In 2008 Siena beat 4th seeded Vanderbilt 83–62 and the following year they edged 8th seeded Ohio State 74–72 in double overtime.

Siena has won 6 conference tournaments throughout program history. They won the 1989 title in the North Atlantic Conference, with a win over Boston University, famously played in front of no fans as a result of a measles outbreak. They have won five conference championships as a member of the Metro Atlantic Athletic Conference. Their most recent championship came in 2020, when they won the MAAC regular season title, they were then awarded the conference's bid to the NCAA tournament when the MAAC tournament was cancelled as a result of the COVID-19 pandemic.

In 2014 Siena competed in their first College Basketball Invitational tournament and won the championship defeating Stony Brook, Penn State, Illinois State and Fresno State two games to one in the best-of-three championship series. Siena's cumulative record in postseason play is 18–13 (4–6 NCAA, 9–5 NIT, 5–2 CBI). In 2020, the program was placed under a three-year probation by the NCAA over player benefit and coaching violations under head coach Jimmy Patsos.

Coaching staff
 Carmen Maciariello, Head Coach (3rd season)

History

1989–2000
In 1989, Siena stars Marc Brown and Steve McCoy led the school to a triumphant victory, an 80–78 win over third seeded Stanford in the NCAA Tournament. The 1993–1994 Saints finished 25–8 making all the way to the NIT final four at Madison Square Garden defeating such teams as Georgia Tech, Tulane, Bradley, and Kansas State. Siena's Doremus Bennerman capped his brilliant college career with a 51-point outburst against Kansas State, winning most outstanding player honors in the NIT.

Brown (2,284) and Bennerman (2,109) are the only two men to score 2,000 points or more while at Siena.

After coach Mike Deane (166–77 in 8 years at Siena) left to take the head coaching job at Marquette, Siena suffered through a terrible 22–59 three-year tenure under Bob Beyer, who was fired. Siena then hired Villanova assistant Paul Hewitt to resurrect the program. Hewitt did so leading the Saints to a 66–27 record during his three years, winning the MAAC tournament championship in 1999 and taking regular season crown in 2000. Hewitt would leave after the 1999–2000 season to take over at Georgia Tech.

2000–04
Louis Orr coached the team for one season (20–11) before leaving for Seton Hall University.  Siena then hired Rob Lanier, an assistant under Rick Barnes at University of Texas. In Lanier's first year Siena struggled through a brutal regular season going 12–18. However the team went on to win the MAAC championship on their home floor and become the first team since Bradley in 1955 to win an NCAA Tournament game with a losing record as they defeated Alcorn State 81–77 in the play in game. Siena would gain an NIT berth in 2003, going 21–11 and beating Big East member Providence along the way. They defeated Villanova and Western Michigan in the NIT before being eliminated by Alabama-Birmingham. Lanier's final two years brought much frustration among Siena fans. In 2003–04, Siena started off 3–0 only to lose their next 10 games and finish the season a disappointing 14–16. Lanier's final year saw an injury-plagued Siena team finish with a program worst 24 losses and he was fired after that season.

Coach McCaffery

2005–06
Fran McCaffery was hired to April 1, 2005 as the 14th coach in Siena history, the 8th at the Division 1 level. McCaffery inherited a team with only a handful of scholarship athletes because several players loyal to coach Lanier transferred to other programs, including Jack McClinton, who went on to earn first team all-ACC honors at the University of Miami. McCaffery's first recruit landed was Kenny Hasbrouck who would go on to score 1,918 points at Siena, earning MAAC Rookie of the Year, MAAC Player of the Year and Mid-Major Player of the Year honors along the way. Hasbrouck started all 128 of his games as a Saint and upon graduation became only the second Siena player to have his jersery retired.

McCaffery guided Siena to a 15–13 record despite being picked to finish last in the Metro Atlantic Athletic Conference. Siena had memorable wins over cross-town rival Albany 82–74 in overtime, as well as an 82–76 triumph at eventual MAAC champion Iona. The Saints clinched a first round bye in the MAAC tournament with a thrilling 98–92 double overtime victory over Niagara on senior day. Siena's season ended with a heartbreaking 63–62 loss to St. Peter's in the MAAC quarterfinals.

2006–07
The Saints started slowly at 11–10 before winning 9 of 10 games to reach the MAAC championship game losing to Niagara 83–79. Siena finished at 20–12, winning 20 or more games for the fifth time in nine seasons. Once again Siena defeated Albany in another instant classic game 76–75 in double overtime. Siena was one of the youngest teams in the conference as five of their top eight players were underclassmen.

Freshman Edwin Ubiles shared the Rookie of the Year award in the MAAC becoming the second player in as many years to win it for the Saints. Kenny Hasbrouck captured the honor in 2005–2006.

2007–08
On November 17 McCaffery guided Siena to a 79–67 win over #20 Stanford University in Albany, NY at the MVP Arena (formerly the Times Union Center). The victory was Siena's first over a ranked opponent since the 1989 NCAA tournament first round also against Stanford. Siena once again defeated Albany 75–71 for their sixth win in seven tries against the Great Danes since the series resumed. Siena dominated their Bracketbuster game against Boise State, another quality mid-major school. The Saints defeated Manhattan, Loyola College (MD), and Rider to win the MAAC tournament and clinch a bid in the NCAA Tournament.

During Selection Sunday, the Saints received a #13 seed in the Midwest Region of the 2008 NCAA tournament. The Saints went on to upset the 4th seeded Vanderbilt Commodores in the first round of the tournament 83–62. The Saints were led by junior Kenny Hasbrouck who scored a team high 30 points. Senior guard Tay Fisher came off the bench to add 19 points on 6-for-6 shooting from 3-point range. The Saints never trailed in the contest and became the first MAAC team to advance since the 2004 tournament.

In the second round of the tournament, the Saints found themselves facing the #12 seed Villanova Wildcats on March 23, 2008. With 25 points from Scottie Reynolds and 20 points from Corey Stokes, the Wildcats cruised to an 84–72 victory over the Saints and Villanova advanced to the sweet sixteen.

Siena was ranked 9th in the final mid-major poll on collegeinsider.com.

2008–09
Siena finished the 2008–09 season with a 23–7 regular season record. Quality wins from the Saints came in the opening game of the season against Boise State, who they beat by 30, an 18-point victory against Cornell (Ivy League Conference champions and a #14 seed in the 2008 NCAA tournament), and a 6-point victory against Northern Iowa (the Missouri Valley Conference Champions and a #12 seed) in the ESPN Bracketbusters game that wasn't as close as the score indicated. Siena finished a perfect 17–0 at MVP Arena.

Siena's very tough non-conference schedule included losses to Tennessee (a #9 seed) by 14, Oklahoma State (a #8 seed) by 9, Pittsburgh (#1 seed) by 13, and Kansas (#3 seed) by 7. Siena's strong showings in these tough matchups earned Siena a well-deserved #9 seed. The Saints cruised through the MAAC Tournament to receive the automatic bid into the 2009 NCAA tournament for the second straight year.  Siena was awarded a #9 seed in the Midwest region, where they drew #8 Ohio State in Dayton, Ohio.  Siena defeated Ohio State 74–72 in a double overtime thriller with Ronald Moore making two late three point shots that earned fame for Bill Raftery’s “Onions, Double Order” call. Siena would go on to lose to the #1 seeded Louisville Cardinals in the second round 79–72 after taking a four-point lead with under 7 minutes left. They ended their season at 27–8.

Siena finished #2 in the final mid-major poll behind only national powerhouse Gonzaga.

Siena finished 28th in the final ESPN coaches poll the schools highest ever ranking. Siena also finished with an RPI of 19.

2009–10

Siena entered the 2009-10 season with the highest expectations in program history. Another slow start put the Saints at 4–3 after a loss at Georgia Tech. Once again Siena made their move going 23–3 to capture their third straight MAAC championship and berth in the NCAA tournament. Siena defeated Fairfield 72–65 in the MAAC championship game in a heart-stopping finish in overtime after trailing by 13 points early in the second half. Alex Franklin was named MAAC tournament MVP in addition to winning the conference's player of the year award.

Siena set a single season record for MAAC regular season wins (17). Despite dominating the MAAC (winning 44 of their last 47 conference games dating back to 2008) the Saints struggled in the second half losing road games to elite team such as Temple, Butler, Georgia Tech and Northern Iowa. Siena's late rally came up short against fourth seeded Purdue in a 72–64 loss in the first round of the NCAA tournament. Siena finished 27–7 the second straight season the school won 27 games.

Coach Buonaguro

2010–13
Long time Siena assistant coach Mitch Buonaguro took over as head coach after McCaffery left for Iowa. The Saints struggled through a 13–18 season that ended with a 94–64 loss to Iona in the MAAC quarterfinals. Siena's marquee win was a 62–57 triumph over Georgia Tech at the MVP Arena.

Siena finished 14–17 and 8–10 (6th in the MAAC). Despite a second straight losing season, Siena enjoyed a much more positive season after a struggling first year under Buonaguro. Because of injuries and NCAA ineligibility the Saints most of the season with only a 6-man rotation. Siena had solid wins over MAAC regular champion and NCAA tournament participant Iona (rallying from 20–2 down), Manhattan, Fairfield, Princeton and UAlbany. In the MAAC tournament, Siena beat Manhattan again 84–82 in overtime before falling to eventual tournament champion Loyola 70–60 in the MAAC semifinals. It was the 12th time in the last 15 seasons that Siena had at least made it to the conference semifinals.

In 2012–13 Siena struggled again and recorded three straight losing season for the first time since 1994–1997. The Saints finished the season at 8–24 and coach Mitch Buonaguro was fired.

Coach Patsos

2013–18
On April 3, 2013, Siena introduced Loyola coach Jimmy Patsos as the 16th head coach in Siena history. In his first year, Patsos guided the Saints to a 20–18 record (11–9 in MAAC conference play) and the program's first-ever postseason championship, winning the 2014 CBI tournament two games to one over Fresno State. The home portion of the three-game series was noteworthy; both games were played at the Alumni Recreation Center on the Siena campus as the MVP Arena was being used for another event.

In Summer 2015, it was announced that Siena would open up its 2015–16 season with away games against the defending Nation Champional Duke Blue Devils and the National runner-up Wisconsin Badgers. Although the odds were heavily in favor of Duke and Wisconsin winning these games, this announcement immediately created an enormous amount of hype around the Siena College campus and the MAAC Conference as a whole. This made the Saints the first Division 1 team to ever open the season against the defending National Champion and the National runner-up from the previous year.

On November 13, 2015, Siena played Duke at Cameroon Indoor Stadium, one of the most famous arenas in all of college basketball. The game was televised on ESPNU. Duke won the game by a score of 92–74.

On November 15, 2015, Siena traveled to Wisconsin to play the Badgers. Siena could not come back from a large first half deficit, as Wisconsin went on to win the game by a score of 92–65.

Siena finished the season with a 21–13 record and third-place finish (13–7) in the MAAC. The Saints had quality wins over NIT participants Hofstra, St. Bonaventure and Bucknell as well as against crosstown rival UAlbany. Siena also defeated eventual MAAC champion Iona on the road 81–78. However, Siena lost to Iona 81–70 to end their MAAC tournament run in the semifinals. The Saints were invited to the CBI tournament where they lost to eventual runner-up Morehead State 84–80.

On April 13, 2018, Patsos resigned after 5 years at Siena, finishing with a 77–92 overall record with the Saints and following an internal investigation regarding financial troubles and abusive conduct within the program.

Player benefits, coaching violations and sanctions 
In 2020 Siena vacated 46 wins from 2015 to 2018 under Patsos, was fined $5,000 by the NCAA, and was forced to remove stats for 28 players, in addition to being placed on probation for three years, as well as a show-cause order being placed on Patsos, after the NCAA found that Patsos provided impermissible benefits, including payments to players, while he was head coach of Siena. According to the NCAA investigation findings players were paid to athletes at least twice each academic year in the general ranges of $60 to $80 and $100 or more, in one instance Patsos allegedly provided a player with a small amount of cash during a meeting in the weight room that took place during the 2017–2018 season. The NCAA also found that Patsos also allowed a noncoaching staff member to engage in unallowed  coaching activity, which caused the program to exceed NCAA limits on countable coaches and provided false or misleading information to the NCAA during the investigation about his involvement in the player benefits violation.

Coach Christian

2018–19
On May 2, 2018, Siena announced the hiring of Jamion Christian as the 17th head coach in the program's history. He came to Siena after 6 seasons as head coach of his alma mater Mount St. Mary's University. In his first season as head coach the Saints -who were picked to finish last in the preseason coaches poll- were able to post an 11–7 conference record and finish tied for 2nd in the regular season. Freshman Jalen Pickett was MAAC Rookie of the Week a record 11 times and Christian's squad set a new team record for three point field goals made in one season. They would receive the 5th seed in the MAAC Tournament and defeated unanimous preseason favorite Rider in the quarterfinals before falling to Iona in the semifinals. Christian's first season is widely regarded as the best ever for a Siena head coach in their first season, especially when considering expectations. On March 21, 2019, Christian announced he would leave Siena for the vacant head coaching position at George Washington.

Coach Maciariello

2019–current

On March 25, 2019, Carmen Maciariello was named the 18th head coach in Siena men's basketball history. 

In Maciariello's first season, he led the Saints to a 2020 MAAC championship. Siena won the regular season title, finishing the season on a 10-game winning steak. After defeating Manhattan in the conference quarterfinals, the MAAC cancelled the tournament as a result of the COVID-19 pandemic, and the Saints were awarded their first NCAA tournament berth since 2010.

Retired numbers

Notes

MAAC Player-of-Year winners
 1991: Marc Brown
 
 1994: Doremus Bennerman
 
 2009: Kenny Hasbrouck
 
 2010: Alex Franklin
 
 2011: Ryan Rossiter

 2020: Jalen Pickett

 2021: Manny Camper

Siena NBA players
 Kenny Hasbrouck, Miami Heat (2010)
 Edwin Ubiles, Washington Wizards (2012)

Notable former players

 Willem Brandwijk
 O.D. Anosike
 Doremus Bennerman
 Matt Brady
 Marc Brown
 Marcus Faison
 Alex Franklin
 Billy Harrell
 Kenny Hasbrouck
 Antoine Jordan
 Scott Knapp
 Edward Lange
 Ronald Moore
 Ryan Rossiter
 Edwin Ubiles
 Marquis Wright

Top 15 all-time leading scorers
 Marc Brown (2,284)
 Doremus Bennerman (2,109)
 Edwin Ubiles (1,939)
 Kenny Hasbrouck (1,917)
 Alex Franklin (1,730)
 Marcus Faison (1,697)
 Jeff Robinson (1,657)
 Dwayne Archbold (1,644)
 Michael Haddix  (1,594)
 Marquis Wright (1,546)
 Brett Bisping (1,528)
 Rob Poole (1,493)
 Ryan Rossiter (1,457)
 Eric Banks (1,432)
 Doug Poetzsch (1,398)

Postseason

NCAA tournament results
The Saints have appeared in six NCAA Tournaments. Their combined record is 4–6. The Saints also qualified for the 2020 tournament, however it was cancelled due to the COVID-19 Pandemic.

NIT results
The Saints have appeared in five National Invitation Tournaments (NIT). Their combined record is 9–5.

CBI results
The Saints have appeared in two College Basketball Invitationals (CBI). Their record is 5–2 winning the 2014 CBI Championship 2 games to 1 over Fresno State.

Season-by-season results (Division I only)

References

External links